Sean Nottage (born 14 April 1965) is a Bahamian swimmer. He competed in three events at the 1984 Summer Olympics.

References

External links
 

1965 births
Living people
Bahamian male swimmers
Olympic swimmers of the Bahamas
Swimmers at the 1984 Summer Olympics
Place of birth missing (living people)